Victor or Vic Richardson may refer to:

Vic Richardson (1894–1969), Australian sportsman
Victor Richardson (soldier) MC (1895–1917), British soldier
Vic Richardson (Australian soldier) (1891–1968), Australian soldier